Napoleão Rodrigues Laureano (August 22, 1914 – May 31, 1951) was a Brazilian cancer specialist. Napoleão Laureano Hospital in João Pessoa, Paraiba is named for him.

References 

1914 births
1951 deaths
Brazilian oncologists